The Abominable Earthman is a collection of science fiction stories by American writer Frederik Pohl, first published by Ballantine Books in 1963.

Contents
 "The Abominable Earthman" (from Galaxy, October 1961)
 "We Never Mention Aunt Nora" (as by Paul Flehr; Galaxy, July 1958)
 "A Life and a Half" (If, July 1959)
 "Punch" (Playboy, June 1961)
 "The Martian Star-Gazers" (Galaxy, February 1962)
 "Whatever Counts" (Galaxy, June 1959)
 "Three Portraits and a Prayer" (Galaxy, August 1962)

References

1963 short story collections
Short story collections by Frederik Pohl
Ballantine Books books